Twelfth Army or 12th Army may refer to:

Germany
 12th Army (German Empire), a unit in World War I
 12th Army (Wehrmacht), a unit in World War II

Russia
 12th Army (Russian Empire), a unit in World War I
 12th Army (RSFSR), a Red Army unit in the Russian Civil War
 12th Army (Soviet Union), a unit of the Soviet Army

Other countries
 Twelfth Army (Japan), a unit of the Imperial Japanese Army
 Twelfth Army (United Kingdom), a unit of the British Army
 Twelfth Army (Italy), a unit in World War I
 12th Army (Austria-Hungary), a unit in World War I

See also
 XII Corps (disambiguation)
 12th Division (disambiguation)
 12th Wing (disambiguation)
 12th Brigade (disambiguation)
 12th Regiment (disambiguation)
 12th Battalion (disambiguation)
 12 Squadron (disambiguation)